The 1957 season was the 27th completed season of Finnish Football League Championship, known as the Mestaruussarja.

Overview
The Mestaruussarja was administered by the Finnish Football Association and the competition's 1957 season was contested by 10 teams. HPS Helsinki won the championship  and qualified for the 1958–59 European Cup first round, while the two lowest placed teams of the competition, KIF Helsinki and KoRe Kotka, were relegated to the Suomensarja.

League standings

Results

Footnotes

References
Finland - List of final tables (RSSSF)

Mestaruussarja seasons
Fin
Fin
1